Eldelek, Çamlıdere is a village in the District of Çamlıdere, Ankara Province, Turkey.  The population of Eldelek in 2012 was 96.

References

Villages in Çamlıdere District